Jean Schwarzwalder (born 1980), known as Suzy Hotrod, is a roller derby skater.

Early life 
Born in Lindenwold, New Jersey, Hotrod began skating in 2004, soon after leaving college, having not previously exercised for four years.  Training with the Gotham Girls Roller Derby league, she was immediately picked out as a potential jammer.  At the time, she worked as a photo editor, and played guitar in the punk band Lady Unluck.

Career 
By 2007, Hotrod was captain of Gotham's "Queens of Pain" team.

After the 2010 WFTDA Championships, Hotrod was expected to move to Philadelphia, and leave the Gotham Girls.  However, her work plans changed, and she remained with Gotham.

Hotrod was appointed co-captain of Team USA for the inaugural Roller Derby World Cup.

Hotrod is also the host of the radio show Rock and Roller Derby on Jersey City-based WFMU.

Recognition 
Hotrod won the Gotham Girls' Most Valuable Player award in both 2006 and 2009, has captained the Queens of Pain to three league titles, and won the Derby News Network readers' award for Best Double Threat in 2010. and again in 2011.

References

1980 births
Living people
People from Lindenwold, New Jersey
Roller derby skaters
American roller skaters
Sportspeople from Camden County, New Jersey